Hraše pri Preddvoru is a small settlement in the Municipality of Preddvor in the Upper Carniola region of Slovenia.

Name
The name of the settlement was changed from Hraše to Hraše pri Preddvoru in 1953.

References

External links
Hraše pri Preddvoru at Geopedia

Populated places in the Municipality of Preddvor